Jarkko Lahdenmäki (born 16 April 1991) a Finnish football player.

References

External links
 
 Pitkä tie Kemijärveltä europeleihin 
 Jarkko Lahdenmäki at RoPS 

1991 births
Living people
Finnish footballers
Finnish expatriate footballers
Veikkausliiga players
Ykkönen players
Kakkonen players
Norwegian First Division players
Norwegian Second Division players
Rovaniemen Palloseura players
Fredrikstad FK players
FC Santa Claus players
TP-47 players
HIFK Fotboll players
FK Mjølner players
Association football defenders
Finnish expatriate sportspeople in Norway
Expatriate footballers in Norway
People from Kemijärvi
Sportspeople from Lapland (Finland)